Israeli invasion of Lebanon may refer to any of several Israeli military campaigns in Israeli-Lebanese Conflict:
 1978 South Lebanon conflict, an invasion of Lebanon up to the Litani River carried out by the Israel Defense Forces
 1982 Lebanon War, Israel Defense Forces invasion of southern Lebanon
 Operation Accountability, week-long attack by Israeli forces against Lebanon in July 1993
 Operation Grapes of Wrath, 1996 Israeli Defense Forces campaign against Lebanon
 2006 Lebanon War, a military conflict in Lebanon, northern Israel and the Golan Heights